Euchlaena is a genus of moths in the family Geometridae erected by Jacob Hübner in 1823.

Species
 Euchlaena amoenaria (Guenée, 1857) – deep yellow euchlaena moth
 Euchlaena aniliaria (Herrich-Schaffer, 1855)
 Euchlaena deductaria (Walker, 1860) – forked euchlaena moth
 Euchlaena deplanaria (Walker, 1863)
 Euchlaena effecta (Walker, 1860) – effective euchlaena moth
 Euchlaena imitata (Maassen, 1890)
 Euchlaena irraria (Barnes & McDunnough, 1917) – least-marked euchlaena moth
 Euchlaena johnsonaria (Fitch, 1869) – Johnson's euchlaena moth
 Euchlaena madusaria (Walker, 1860) – scrub euchlaena moth
 Euchlaena manubiaria (Hulst, 1886)
 Euchlaena marginaria (Minot, 1869) – ochre euchlaena moth
 Euchlaena milnei McDunnough, 1945
 Euchlaena mollisaria (Hulst, 1886)
 Euchlaena muzaria (Walker, 1860)
 Euchlaena obtusaria (Hübner, 1809–13) – obtuse euchlaena moth
 Euchlaena serrata (Drury, 1770) – saw-wing moth
 Euchlaena silacea Rindge, 1958
 Euchlaena tigrinaria (Guenée, 1857) – mottled euchlaena moth
 Euchlaena undularia (Dyar, 1910)

Former species
Euchlaena pectinaria (Denis & Schiffermüller, 1775)

References

External links

Angeronini